The China Men's National Wheelchair Basketball Team is the wheelchair basketball side that represents China in international competitions for men as part of the International Wheelchair Basketball Federation.

Competitions

Wheelchair Basketball World Championship

Asia Oceania Zone

Summer Paralympics

References

National men's wheelchair basketball teams
Wheelchair basketball
National mens